Robert Jobling (1841–1923) was a British artist. He first had work accepted by both the Royal Academy and Royal Society of British Artists in 1883. He painted regularly at  the fishing village of Cullercoats and later at Staithes. He attained a position of some standing in the Staithes group. His main artistic exposure was in exhibitions in the north of England.

Jobling lived in Whitley Bay (near Cullercoats) and was a prominent member of the Cullercoats artist colony, along with Henry Emmerson, and various other artists including Winslow Homer. In 1890, the Newcastle Daily Journal wrote, "Mr. Jobling has made Cullercoats famous for his canvases, and by-the-by he will be famous for over-running the village with tourists."

References 

19th-century British painters
British male painters
1841 births
1923 deaths
20th-century British painters
People from Whitley Bay
People from Cullercoats
19th-century British male artists
20th-century British male artists